The 1997–98 season was the 87th season in Hajduk Split’s history and their seventh in the Prva HNL. Their 2nd place finish in the 1996–97 season meant it was their 7th successive season playing in the Prva HNL.

Competitions

Overall record

Prva HNL

First stage

Second stage (championship play-off)

Results summary

Results by round

Results by opponent

Source: 1997–98 Croatian First Football League article

Matches

Prva HNL

Source: hajduk.hr

Croatian Football Cup

Source: hajduk.hr

UEFA Cup

Source: hajduk.hr

Player seasonal records

Top scorers

Source: Competitive matches

See also
1997–98 Croatian First Football League
1997–98 Croatian Football Cup

References

External sources
 1997–98 Prva HNL at HRnogomet.com
 1997–98 Croatian Cup at HRnogomet.com
 1997–98 UEFA Cup at rsssf.com

HNK Hajduk Split seasons
Hajduk Split